Xiche is a small town in the North West Hunan Province of China.

References

Towns of Xiangxi Tujia and Miao Autonomous Prefecture